Petriccione is a surname. Notable people with the surname include:

Italo Petriccione (born 1958), Italian cinematographer
Jacopo Petriccione (born 1995), Italian football player 

Italian-language surnames